Regensteiner is a German surname. Notable people with the surname include:

 Else Regensteiner (1906–2003), German weaver and textile designer
 Theodore Regensteiner (1868–1952), German printer

German-language surnames